Xiayadong Township, known in Tibetan as Dromo Mechü is a township in the Chumbi Valley in Yadong County, Shigatse, in the Tibet Autonomous Region of China. Xiayadong Township's population totaled 897 as of 2018.

The township straddles the disputed Bhutan-China border, near the sites of the 2017 China-India border standoff.

Geography 
The township's center is the village of Rinchengang, on the bank of the Amo Chu valley, which also receives the track from Sikkim's Jelep La pass. In addition to Rinchengang, the township also includes the Geling, Chema and Pipitang villages upstream along the Amo Chu, and Assam-Rotsa (or Asamthang) downstream.

In addition, the Township includes large territories in Bhutan that China claims. These include the Doklam region, Lulin and Charitang. These claims however do not find historical support in the testimony of British Indian officials.

Demographics 
As of 2018, Xiayadong Township has a population of 897. The township had a population of 1,097 as of 2010.

Administrative divisions 
Xiayadong administers two administrative villages: Rinchengang and Chema.

See also 

 2017 China-India border standoff
 Bhutan-China border
 Chema
 Pangda
 Rinchengang
 Yadong County

Notes

References

Bibliography 
 

Populated places in Shigatse
Yadong County
Township-level divisions of Tibet
Bhutan–China border